Fidler is a surname. Notable people with the surname include:

People
Alwyn Sheppard Fidler CBE (1909–1990), Welsh architect and town planner, chief architect for the new town of Crawley from 1947 to 1952
Artyom Fidler (born 1983), Russian professional footballer
Bohumil Fidler (also Fiedler) (1860–1944), Czech composer, choirmaster, choral conductor and music teacher
Dennis Fidler (born 1938), English former footballer
Eugene Fidler, French painter and ceramicist
Jim Fidler (born 1960), singer, producer, and musician living in St. John's, Newfoundland and Labrador
Jimmie Fidler (1900–1988), American columnist, journalist and radio and television personality
Lewis Fidler (1956–2019), New York City Councilman
Michael Fidler (1916–1989), British Conservative Party politician
Mike Fidler (born 1956), retired professional ice hockey player
Pete Fidler, dobro player from Melbourne, Australia
Peter Fidler (explorer) (1769–1822), British surveyor, map-maker, chief fur trader and explorer
Richard Fidler (born 1964), well-known Australian Republican and Australian ABC TV and radio presenter

Places
Fidler's Mill, historic grist mill located at Arlington, Upshur County, West Virginia, United States
Lake Fidler, meromictic lake beside the Gordon River in the Wilderness World Heritage area of the west coast of Tasmania, Australia

Other uses 
Fiddler, a bowed string musical instrument
Fiddler, a free and interoperable web debugging proxy

hu:Fiedler (egyértelműsítő lap)#Fidler